This is a list of defunct airlines of Angola.

See also

 List of airlines of Angola
 List of airports in Angola

References

Angola
Airlines
Airlines, defunct